Rangappa is a surname. Notable people with the surname include:

Asha Rangappa (born 1974), American legal scholar
K. S. Rangappa, Indian chemistry professor

Indian surnames